Mattias Persson (born April 9, 1985) is a Swedish professional ice hockey player. He currently plays for Rungsted Seier Capital of the Metal Ligaen.

References

External links

1985 births
Living people
Luleå HF players
Swedish ice hockey forwards